The eighth season of the Australian police-drama Blue Heelers premiered on the Seven Network on 21 February 2001 and aired on Wednesday nights at 8:30 PM. The 42-episode season concluded 28 November 2001.

Casting

Main cast for this season consisted of:
 John Wood as Senior Sergeant Tom Croydon (full season)
 Julie Nihill as Christine 'Chris' Riley (full season)
 Martin Sacks as Senior Detective Patrick Joseph 'P.J.' Hasham (full season)
 Paul Bishop as Senior Constable Benjamin 'Ben' Stewart (full season)
 Rupert Reid as Constable Jack Lawson (until Episode 313)
 Jane Allsop as Constable Jo Parrish (full season)
 Ditch Davey as Constable Evan 'Jonesy' Jones (from Episode 316)
 Caroline Craig as Sergeant Tess Gallagher (full season)

Notable guest actors who appeared in this season included Carol Burns, Richard Cawthorne, Norman Yemm, Val Lehman, David Clencie, Simon Burke, Terry Gill, Alethea McGrath, Gary Sweet, Rhys Muldoon, Gary Day, Lisa Crittenden, Julia Blake, Alan Hopgood, Gerard Kennedy, Lesley Baker and Kirsty Child.

Plot

Jack is beginning to get the hang of his legs again after the 5% operation was a success. Tess begins to have feelings for Jack up to a point where they start a secret relationship in the episode "Manly Art". Their relationship is going somewhere until a case comes up about an old time drug dealer who just got out of prison. Jack begins to put his emotions in front of the job and will do anything to get his own justice. Jack is suspect for murder by Killing the drug dealer. Tess says one of them should get a transfer to St Davids because they could never work together if they can't trust one another. Jack then admits he could have saved the guy but instead watched him fall to his death. Jack is charged and dismissed from the force. While Tess is feeling sad the members are disappointed by the fact he did kill the guy and didn't admit the truth earlier. New probationary Constable Jones has arrived with a secret plot to find out what really happened in his father's death. Tess and Jo quickly take a liking to him but Tess remembers what happened to her last secret relationship with Jack and doesn't want to relive that moment so she keeps it to herself and gets on with her job as a sergeant. After all Tess knows not to mix work with play.

Reception

Ratings in the 8th season began to decline slowly, with many fans feeling that Maggie's absence, or the absence of the so-called "McCune-Factor" (as well as the absence of several other popular characters) and the slightly repetitive storylines were getting in the way of the show's feel.

Awards

Episodes

Weakest Link Special Episode 
On 9 August 2001, a special episode of The Weakest Link featuring the actors from Blue Heelers went to air. The results were as follows:

Note that the following are regarding the contestant, not the contestant the contestant votes against:
 Red indicates the contestant was the weakest link
 Lime indicates the contestant was the strongest link

1 Jeremy and Caroline tied with three votes each, but as Neil was the strongest link, he opted to vote Caroline off.

2 Jeremy and Suzi tied with two votes each, but as Jeremy was the strongest link, and could not vote himself off, he opted to vote Suzi off, though he originally voted for Neil who was not part of the tie.

Peta was first eliminated for not answering enough questions correctly. Caroline was next on a countback also for not answering enough questions correctly. Paul followed for being too big a threat to the team. Jane was voted out for not answering any questions correctly. Suzi was eliminated on a countback for not answering enough questions correctly. Jeremy was next also for not answering enough questions correctly. Ditch was voted out for not banking anything nor answering any questions correctly. In the end, John defeated Neil in the head-to-head round.

The final total won was $35,400, which John donated to the Red Cross Australia.

DVD release 
Similarly to the release of Blue Heelers seventh season, the eight season was also postponed due to the contractual negotiations. However, everything was finalised for a 1 October 2008 release. Like the seventh season, "The Complete Eight Season" will be released as a complete boxset.

References

General
 Zuk, T. Blue Heelers: 2001 episode guide, Australian Television Information Archive. Retrieved 1 August 2007.
 TV.com editors. Blue Heelers Episode Guide - Season 8, TV.com. Retrieved 1 August 2007.
Specific

Blue Heelers seasons
2001 Australian television seasons